Margaret Robertson may refer to:

 Margaret Hills (1882–1967), née Robertson, British teacher, suffragist organiser, feminist and socialist
 Margaret Murray Robertson (1823–1897), Scottish-Canadian teacher and writer